Ron Chancey (born August 6, 1935) is a record producer who works primarily in the country music field. He has produced albums and songs by Bob Seger, The Oak Ridge Boys, and produced Jeris Ross and Billy "Crash" Craddock. Chancey also served as the head of artists and repertoire at MCA Nashville in the 1980s.

His son, Blake, is a record producer as well.

References

External links 
 Ron Chancey Productions

American country record producers
Living people
Place of birth missing (living people)
1935 births